Pitch Black Forecast is an American heavy metal supergroup formed in 2005 with a lineup consisting of Mushroomhead frontman Jason Popson and ex-Strapping Young Lad drummer Gene Hoglan and former Integrity bassist Steve Rauckhorst. Formed in Ohio back in 2005 under the name Absentee. They released their debut album Absentee in 2008 featuring guest contributions from Lamb of God frontman Randy Blythe and Human Furnace of Ringworm.

History 
Hoglan and Popson met back in 2004 while Jason was selling T-shirts for Meshuggah while they were on tour with Strapping Young Lad. Popson was taking a break from touring with Mushroomhead where he was known as J Mann. He never mentioned that he was Mushroomhead's frontman and it wasn't until late in the tour that Hoglan found out. Originally, the group was intended to be similar to Probot with Popson as the vocalist and a revolving door of guitarists and drummers. When Popson was finally ready to record, though, the only one who was not busy was Hoglan. In January 2007, Hoglan flew to Ohio and he and Popson wrote and recorded Absentee in 10 days. Guitarist Rob Reinard (NDE) was brought in by studio engineer Bill Korecky. Bassist Craig Martini was also brought in for the band. Popson and Martini are longtime friends and have performed in bands in the past, including Unified Culture, State of Conviction and The Alter Boys. Shortly after finishing recording Absentee Martini left the band in good terms, relocating to Nevada and was replaced by Steve Rauckhorst, who Popson had previously known from the Cleveland scene and his time in Integrity. They played their first show in nearly six months at Peabody's in Cleveland. On May 5, 2011, Pitch Black Forecast announced Tom Shaffner of Keratoma fame would be their new second guitarist. The band's name was originally "Absentee" before switching it to Pitch Black Forecast and using the former as the name of the first album. The first track recorded, titled "Revolve", was included on the Melvins Tribute album We Reach: The Music of the Melvins and released on Popson's record label, Fractured Transmitter.

The band's second album, a five-track EP, titled Burning in Water... Drowning in Flame was recorded at Cleveland's Galahad Studios and was released on August 11, 2012, at a live show for Popson's bands Unified Culture and State of Conviction at Peabody's Down Under in Cleveland. The album features Devin Townsend and M. Shadows from Avenged Sevenfold

In summer of 2014 the band's Facebook page mentioned a new album later in the year.  The post stated the release would be a compilation of previously-released songs remixed and re-tracked to become "closer" to the vision Popson desired from the start. The title of the album was later revealed to be As The World Burns. It was released October 21 on compact disc, vinyl and digital download by Ohio-based Ferocious Records.  The album features guest appearances by M. Shadows of Avenged Sevenfold, Randy Blythe of Lamb of God, Devin Townsend, and The Human Furnace.  The digital and CD versions both contain a 4 track EP entitled "Spitefuck" by Popson's other side project called Bitch Wrangler.  A Best Buy Exclusive version of the CD contains 3 additional tracks.

Related artists 
Mushroomhead – Jason Popson (as J Mann)/Steve Rauckhorst (as Mr. Rauckhorst)/Tom Shaffner (as Tankx)
(216) – Jason Popson
In Cold Blood – Jason Popson
The Alter Boys – Jason Popson
Strapping Young Lad – Gene Hoglan
Testament – Gene Hoglan
Dark Angel – Gene Hoglan
Death – Gene Hoglan
Fear Factory – Gene Hoglan
Dethklok – Gene Hoglan
NDE – Rob Reinard
Nailblack – Rob Reinard
The Alter Boys – Jason Popson/Craig Martin
State of Conviction – Jason Popson/Craig Martini/Tom Shaffner
Unified Culture – Jason Popson/Craig Martini
Integrity – Steve Rauckhorst
Keratoma – Steve Rauckhorst/Tom Shaffner
The X Members – Tom Shaffner

Discography 
 Absentee (2008)
 Burning in Water... Drowning in Flame (2012)
 As the World Burns (2014)

Members

Current members 
Jason Popson – vocals (2005–present)
Gene Hoglan – drums (2005–present)
Rob Reinard – guitar (2007–present)
Steve Rauckhorst – bass (2008–present)
Tom Shaffner – guitar (2009–present)

Former members 
Craig Martini – bass (2007–2008)

See also 
Fractured Transmitter Recording Company

External links 
"Pitch Black Forecast" by Matt Gorey, Cleveland Scene (May 2008)

Musical groups established in 2005
Heavy metal musical groups from Ohio
Musical groups from Cleveland